Ben Matthew Ashkenazi (born 5 October 1994) is an Australian cricketer. He represented Australia at the 2014 Under-19 Cricket World Cup. He was born in Pearcedale, Australia.

References

External links
 
 

Living people
1994 births
Australian cricketers
Cricketers from Victoria (Australia)